Alaki (Persian: الکی, meaning fake, irrelevant, or insincere) is a live album by Iranian singer-songwriter Mohsen Namjoo. The album is a recording  of a performance at Stanford University in February 2011.  The title track Alaki is based on a postmodern poem with social, and at times satirical content that blurs the lines between poetry, music and participatory theater.

Track listing
 "Hoosham Bebar" (Take My Breath Away) - 7:01
 "Halal Halaa" - 8:25
 "Nameh" (The Letter) - 6:50
 "Aane Man Ast Oo" (He Belongs To Me) - 7:06
 "Deylaman" - 12:51
 "Zadeh" (Struck) - 5:49
 "Yaare Jaani" (My Dear Beloved) - 2:50
 "Alaki" - 14:12
 "Zolf" (A Lock of Her Hair) - 6:18

Sources of lyrics
Hoosham Bebar is a ghazal by the famous Persian poet Saadi.
Nameh, Zadeh and Zolf are three ghazals by the famous Persian poet Hafez.
Aane Man Ast Oo and Deylaman are two ghazals by the famous Persian poet Rumi (Molavi).
Yaare Jaani is an Iranian folklore ethnic song from Birjand.
Alaki is a poem by Mohsen Namjoo.

Credits
 Ali Bazyar: Percussion
 Mark Deutsch: Bazantar, Guitar
 Keyavash Nourai: Kamancheh, Cello
 Siamack Sanaie: Acoustic Guitar, Rhythm Guitar
 Serwah Tabbak: Backing Vocal
 Tannaz Jafarian: Backing Vocal
 Dina Zarif: Backing Vocal
 Shadi Yousefian: Backing Vocal
 Mammad Zadeh: Udu, Setar, Daf, Bass
 Mohsen Namjoo: Vocals, Setar, Acoustic Guitar

Online Sources
Alaki on iTunes
Alaki at Amazon
Alaki Digital download release news at Mohsennamjoo.com

External links
 Alaki at Cdbaby

Mohsen Namjoo albums
2012 live albums